The 2022–23 Leicester City W.F.C. season is the club's 19th season of existence and their second season in the Women's Super League, the highest level of the football pyramid. Along with competing in the WSL, the club will also contest two domestic cup competitions: the FA Cup and the League Cup.

On 3 November 2022, Leicester sacked manager Lydia Bedford after 332 days in charge and promoted Willie Kirk to the role. He had joined the club as Director of Women's and Girl's Football in July 2022.

Squad

Preseason

Women's Super League

Results summary

Results by matchday

Results

League table

Women's FA Cup 

As a member of the first tier, Leicester City entered the FA Cup in the fourth round proper.

FA Women's League Cup

Group stage

Squad statistics

Appearances 

Starting appearances are listed first, followed by substitute appearances after the + symbol where applicable.

|-
|colspan="12"|Players away from the club on loan:

|-
|colspan="12"|Players who appeared for the club but left during the season:

|}

Transfers

Transfers in

Loans in

Transfers out

Loans out

References 

Leicester City